Rupali Saikate (English: The Silver Beach) is a 1979 Bangladeshi film directed by Alamgir Kabir The film stars Bulbul Ahmed, Jayshree Kabir and Sharmili Ahmed.

Cast 
 Bulbul Ahmed
 Jayshree Kabir
 Anwar Hossain
 Sharmilee Ahmed
 Nutan
 Anjana Sultana
 Rozi Samad
 Ujjal

Awards
 Winner: Bachsas Award for Best Film (1979)

References

External links
 ব্রিটিশ ফিল্ম ইন্সটিটিউটের "বাংলাদেশের সেরা ১০ চলচ্চিত্র" তালিকায় স্থান পেয়েছে 'রূপালী সৈকতে'
 
 Rupali Saikate

1979 films
Bengali-language Bangladeshi films
1970s Bengali-language films
Films directed by Alamgir Kabir